Vienna Mathews High School is a public high school in Vienna, Ohio. Trumbull County, Ohio It is the only high school in the Mathews Local School District. Their mascot is the Mustangs, and compete as a member of the Ohio High School Athletic Association and is a member of the Northeastern Athletic Conference. 

The Mathews Local School District was originally formed in 1961 as a merger of the Vienna Township Rural School District and the Fowler Township Rural School District.

Mathews High School sports teams adapted the colors of the Vienna and Fowler high school teams: the red from the red and white of the Vienna Flyers (the symbol of which was the P-51 Mustang fighter) and black of the orange and black of the Fowler Wolverines.  Its current mascot is the Mustang (horse, not to be confused with the Bronco).

On January 17, 2014, the floor of the Vienna Memorial Auditorium was renamed "Rex Leach Court" after Rex Leach, the all-star player for the Vienna Flyers.  Leach held numerous state records, one of which (most points in a single game) still stands today.

Athletics
Mathews High School currently offers:

 Baseball
 Basketball
 Cross Country
 Cheerleading
 Football
 Golf
 Soccer
 Softball
 Track and field
 Volleyball

Ohio High School Athletic Association State Championships

 Girls Basketball – 1988

Notes and references

External links
 District Website

High schools in Trumbull County, Ohio
Public high schools in Ohio
Public middle schools in Ohio